Ensanche Piantini is a district or neighborhood within the city of Santo Domingo in the National District of the Dominican Republic.

Piantini is in particular populated by individuals from the upper class, and has the second most expensive price per m² in the country, after Los Cacicazgos’ Anacaona Avenue.

References

Notes

Sources 

Populated places in Santo Domingo